Xanthodura hypocrypta is a species of moth in the family Geometridae first described by Louis Beethoven Prout in 1925. It is found in central Madagascar.

References
Prout, L. B. (1925). "New Geometridae from Madagascar in the collection of Sir H. Kenrick". Transactions of the Entomological Society of London. 1925(1–2): 301–319, pl. 38.

Geometrinae
Moths of Madagascar
Moths of Africa
Moths described in 1925